Jānis Šmēdiņš (born 31 July 1987) is a Latvian beach volleyball player. From 2008 to 2012 he played together with Mārtiņš Pļaviņš. They won bronze medal at European Championships 2010. Two years later they won bronze medal in 2012 Olympic Games in London. After 2012 he played with Aleksandrs Samoilovs and the duo are among world leaders before 2016 Olympic Games in Rio.

References

External links
 

 

1987 births
Living people
Latvian beach volleyball players
Men's beach volleyball players
Beach volleyball players at the 2012 Summer Olympics
Beach volleyball players at the 2016 Summer Olympics
Olympic beach volleyball players of Latvia
Olympic bronze medalists for Latvia
Olympic medalists in volleyball
Medalists at the 2012 Summer Olympics
People from Kuldīga
Latvian Academy of Sport Education alumni
FIVB World Tour award winners